Nakase is a Japanese surname. Notable people with the surname include:

Asuka Nakase (born 1980), Japanese voice actress
Natalie Nakase (born 1980), American basketball coach and former player
Rika Nakase, Japanese anime screenwriter
Takuya Nakase (born 1982), Japanese gymnast